The Stand (also known as Stephen King's The Stand) is a 1994 American post-apocalyptic television miniseries based on the 1978 novel of the same name by Stephen King. King also wrote the teleplay and has a minor role in the series. It was directed by Mick Garris, who previously directed the original King screenplay/film Sleepwalkers (1992). In order to satisfy expectations from King fans and King himself, The Stand is a mostly faithful adaptation to the original book, with only minor changes to material that would otherwise have not met broadcast standards and practices, and in order to keep ABC content.

The Stand includes a cast of more than 125 speaking roles and features Gary Sinise, Miguel Ferrer, Rob Lowe, Ossie Davis, Ruby Dee, Jamey Sheridan, Laura San Giacomo, Molly Ringwald, Corin Nemec, Adam Storke, Ray Walston, Ed Harris, and Matt Frewer. The miniseries was shot in several locations and on 225 sets. Each episode was given a $6 million budget so to reduce cost, the miniseries was shot on 16 mm film. The Stand originally aired on ABC from May 8 to May 12, 1994. Reviews were positive and the miniseries was nominated for six Primetime Emmy Awards, winning two for its makeup and sound mixing.

Plot
On June 13, at a top-secret government laboratory in rural California, a weaponized version of influenza, called Project Blue, is accidentally released. A U.S. Army soldier, Charlie Campion, escapes the lab and flees across the country with his wife and daughter, unintentionally spreading the virus. On June 17, Campion crashes his car into a gas station in Arnette, Texas, where Stu Redman and some friends are gathered. With his wife and child already dead from the superflu, Campion warns Redman that he had been pursued by a "Dark Man" before he succumbs to the virus as well. The next day, the U.S. military arrives to quarantine the town on orders from General Starkey, commander of Project Blue.

The townspeople are taken to a CDC facility in Stovington, Vermont. All but Stu succumb to the superflu, called "Captain Trips" by the populace, which kills 99.4% of the world's population in two weeks. The scattered survivors include would-be rock star Larry Underwood, deaf mute Nick Andros, Frannie Goldsmith and her unborn child, her teenaged neighbor Harold Lauder, imprisoned criminal Lloyd Henreid, and "Trashcan Man", a mentally ill arsonist and scavenger. The survivors begin having visions, either from kindly Mother Abagail, or from the demonic "Dark Man" Randall Flagg. The dreams counsel the survivors to either travel to Nebraska to meet Abagail, or to Las Vegas to join Flagg.

Lloyd is freed from prison by Flagg in exchange for becoming his second in command. Trashcan Man destroys fuel tanks across the Midwest and is directed to Las Vegas by Flagg. Larry escapes New York City with a mysterious virginal woman named Nadine Cross. Despite their mutual attraction, Nadine is unable to consummate a relationship with Larry because of her visions of Flagg, who commands her to join him; she leaves Larry to travel on her own. Larry then meets a school teacher named Lucy, and a traumatized boy she calls Joe, outside Des Moines, Iowa, which has burned to the ground. After escaping the CDC facility, Stu gathers a group of survivors, including Frannie, Harold, and former college professor Glen Bateman. They are joined by various other immune survivors.

Harold is consumed with jealousy over Stu's leadership of the group and his growing relationship with Frannie, on whom Harold has an unrequited crush. Nick barely escapes an attempt on his life in Shoyo, Arkansas by the bigoted town bully, and makes his way across the Mid-South. Nick ends up in May, Oklahoma where he meets Tom Cullen, a mentally challenged man who spells every meaningful word he utters as M-O-O-N. The two men travel into Kansas, and encounter Julie Lawry, a vicious girl who vows to kill them when they refuse to let her join them. Nick and Tom then meet kindly farmer Ralph Brentner, and the three head west together in Ralph's pickup truck. Nick's group reaches Abagail's farm in Hemingford Home, Nebraska. She warns that a great conflict is imminent and they must travel to Boulder, Colorado. The survivors form a community called the Boulder Free Zone and begin restoring civilization.

Flagg sets up a brutal autocratic regime in Las Vegas which he rules with an iron fist, with the intent of defeating the Boulder survivors using salvaged nuclear weapons, which he sends "Trashcan Man" out to find. Harold's resentment toward Stu and Frannie intensifies, causing him to be seduced by Nadine and join forces with Flagg. Abagail, convinced that she has fallen into the sin of pride, leaves Boulder to walk in the wilderness in an act of atonement. Three Boulder survivors are chosen by the Free Zone Committee to infiltrate Las Vegas as spies: Tom, Dayna Jurgens, and Judge Farris. Glen hypnotizes Tom to follow a specific set of instructions, including that he leave Las Vegas at the next full moon.

Harold and Nadine plant a bomb in Frannie and Stu's home using demolition dynamite, planning to set it off during a meeting of the Free Zone Committee. A weakened Abagail returns to town, and gives a psychic warning to the council members. Most of the council escape the explosion, but Nick and a few others are killed. Before she dies, Abagail tells Stu, Larry, Glen, Ralph, and Frannie that God commands that the men must travel by foot to Las Vegas to confront Flagg, but one of them will fall along the way. When Nadine and Harold flee Boulder, Flagg causes Harold to be crippled in a motorcycle accident. Nadine leaves him in a ravine, and he kills himself with a gun the next day. Once Nadine reaches the desert, Flagg calls her to him. She realizes that she has made a terrible mistake and tries to escape, but Flagg declares it is too late for her to turn back, reveals his true demonic form, and rapes her. Nadine is catatonic following the sexual attack by Flagg, and her hair has turned white. Flagg's men intercept Judge Farris, who is accidentally killed by one of his henchmen, Bobby Terry, before he can be tortured. Flagg tears Bobby to pieces for not following instructions. Upon returning to Las Vegas, Flagg has Dayna brought to him. He plans to torture her for information about the identity of the third spy. Flagg saw Judge Farris and Dayna with his powers, but whenever he tries to see the third spy, all he sees is the moon. After a failed attempt to kill Flagg, Dayna kills herself before he can extract any useful information from her.

Tom leaves Las Vegas when the moon is full, but Julie Lawry recognizes him; she tries to alert Flagg, but Tom escapes into the desert and hides from Flagg and his men. A crazed Nadine taunts Flagg that he is losing control over his empire. She then commits suicide by jumping off the hotel balcony with the demon baby he conceived in her. With winter approaching, Stu, Larry, Glen, and Ralph leave Boulder to set out on their quest. Stu breaks his leg when he falls in a dry riverbed, and must be left behind with Glen's dog, Kojak. The remaining three are captured by Flagg's forces a few days later, and Glen is separated from Larry and Ralph. Flagg orders Lloyd to shoot and kill Glen after he taunts Flagg. As Larry and Ralph endure a show trial on Fremont Street, Flagg uses his powers to silence a dissenter, striking him with a ball of plasma energy emitted from his fingers. "Trashcan Man" arrives at that moment towing a stolen nuclear warhead with an ATV and showing signs of radiation poisoning, so Flagg orders Lloyd to kill him. Flagg is unable to stop the energy ball from transforming into a spectral hand, the Hand of God, and it detonates the nuclear bomb as the voice of Mother Abagail declares that God's promise has been kept, and welcomes Larry and Ralph into heaven. Las Vegas is destroyed by the nuclear blast, and Flagg is apparently killed along with all of his followers.

Stu is rescued by Tom, and they witness the nuclear explosion together. Tom and Stu find a working car and make it to a nearby cabin where Tom sets Stu's leg just as a winter storm arrives. Stu contracts the flu, but in a dream, Nick comes to Tom and tells him which medicine to give him. Stu recovers from the infection after a number of days, and the two of them return to Boulder in a snowstorm via a Snowcat. Stu finds that Frannie has given birth to a daughter, whom she has named Abagail. The baby has contracted the superflu, but she is able to fight off the virus. Lucy reveals that she is pregnant with Larry's child, and Joe sees a spectral image of Mother Abagail, as she blesses the newborn baby. Assured that the immune survivors can safely reproduce, the inhabitants of Boulder set to work rebuilding the world.

Cast

Development

As a theatrical film
King and George A. Romero's first conversations with each other were about the development of an adaptation of 'Salem's Lot (1975) in the late 1970s; although Romero wouldn't be involved in any adaptation of that novel, he did express interest in adapting The Stand during these discussions. While King initially didn't think of the novel being worthy of a film version, Romero's reason was the amount of traveling he could do, as the novel takes place in several locations; and the story's relevance to social issues.

Due to the epic style of the novel demanding a huge budget, King and Romero's primary concern was possibly having to deal with financing from major studios, which would likely have meant losing a lot of artistic control or worsening studio reputation if the film was a box office bomb. King recalled in a 1980 interview of Hollywood middlemen being skeptical of Romero's idea of The Stand becoming a feature-length picture for the content's huge scale. There were some studios that did offer King and Romero several option contracts for adapting The Stand shortly after the novel's release, but the two turned all of them down.

At the same time, Laurel Entertainment's Richard P. Rubinstein was also obsessed with trying to produce a film of The Stand since the book had been published in 1978, and it became Laurel's pet project throughout the adaptation's development as a theatrical production. In a summer 1979 talk between Romero and Rubinstein, they came up with an idea of how to fund it independently: by producing Creepshow, a low-budget original film that would create a huge profit and increase Laurel's credibility. Both Creepshow and The Stand were first announced in a summer 1980 edition of Cinefantastique, and King completed the first draft in early 1981.

Warner Bros. initially wanted King to do a single, two-hour script, but he ended up turning in a screenplay that was over 400 pages (equivalent to six hours in length). Creepshow was released in 1982 to commercial success, and The Stand project garnered the interest of Warner Bros., a company that placed it into development. The budget for The Stand was set around $15–25 million just after Creepshow's release.

As of September 1982, King had completed two drafts of The Stand. The second draft planned for it to be a two-film series with each movie being two hours. However, Laurel, by the completion of King's third draft in December 1983, switched the plan to one three-hour film.

Dario Argento stated in a 1983 interview that he was once approached to direct a film version of The Stand but rejected the offer due to a lack of interest in working on adaptations.

King completed the final draft circa 1986. Despite Romero's initial excitement, he grew increasingly distant from the project due to the poor box office performance of King films in the 1980s and conflicts between him and Rubinstein leading him to leave Laurel.

Hollywood significantly increased their interest in screen adaptations of King's work after the box office success of Pet Sematary (1989), and many were being pitched in studios following the film's release; one of these was an adaptation of The Stand, which was reported in a January 1990 Cinefantastique article to be "the most anticipated" developing King project. Stephen King's most popular novel among fans, The Stand was controversial as a film adaptation from the beginning. Nevertheless, King began working on a screenplay based on the book for Rubinstein.

King wrote a 700-page screenplay and then made five attempts to condense it into a 130-page script. Rubinstein disliked King's drafts, suggesting the author knew the novel too closely. Thus, he hired Rospo Pallenberg for screenwriting duties and planned for John Boorman to direct. Rubinstein and Laurel were very serious about the project to the point where they paid Pallenberg $30,000 for just one treatment. However, nothing further materialized. As King put it simply, there was "too much story for a movie," and yet he was skeptical about making a TV version of the book because "you can't have the end of the world brought to you by Charmin toilet tissue."

As a television miniseries
In June 1992, King figured that a miniseries was a way to present most of the novel's contents without having to deal with the other broadcast Standards and Practices regular television shows face. He spent four months writing a 420-page first draft without using his or Pallenberg's theatrical film drafts as reference. He submitted the draft to ABC, which offered King the ability for the script to be produced just days after submission. The network also had to follow conditions that it couldn't throw so many Standards and Practices at him that it would ruin the spirit of the source material.

Worried about not disappointing fans, King took six months just to write one draft, "and then there were two more." King wrote six drafts of the miniseries before production began. Only minor changes were made in writing the miniseries, and while it is not based on the 1990 expanded version of the novel, the first scenes of the miniseries are taken from that edition. ABC still had discussions with King and Garris about certain plot elements likely not following practices, such as the use of a mummified child doll, a man on a cross wearing a crown of drug needles with the sign "Drug Addict" on his neck, and open-eyed corpses. A lot of these, however, were kept in the final product because of expectations from fans of The Stand.

While ABC and Rubinstein suggested Brian De Palma to direct The Stand, King chose Mick Garris after viewing his work for Psycho IV: The Beginning (1990) and the 1992 film version of King's Sleepwalkers. King thought the director was good at just being a "medium" that did not alter the story's original message. King told Garris about the project while both were on the set on Sleepwalkers, and Garris signed on due to the content's unusual fantasy elements and the large scale of the production he would be dealing with, such as in effects, outdoor locations, action sequences, and the number of extras.

Casting
Despite the script's 125-plus speaking roles, casting for The Stand was very easy except for one character: Randall Flagg. While Miguel Ferrer, who played Lloyd Henreid, was interested in the part, Garris and King had other plans, searching for any A-list Hollywood actor they thought was suitable for the part, such as Christopher Walken, Jeff Goldblum, Willem Dafoe, James Woods, Lance Henriksen, and David Bowie; none of them were available. Steve Johnson recalled Garris' ideas of a possible Flagg actor to be "a bit against normal kinds of view points in casting." King himself had suggested Robert Duvall in his introduction to the novel. Ultimately, after seeing a lesser-known Jamey Sheridan as a psycho killer in Whispers in the Dark (1992), King considered him for the part. As King explained, "when he came into readings, he said, 'Flagg is really a funny guy, isn't he?' And I was sold."

Moses Gunn had originally been cast as Judge Farris, but shortly after filming had commenced his health declined, and he died shortly after that. Ossie Davis, who was present at the filming because his wife, Ruby Dee, was playing Mother Abagail, took over the role of Judge Farris. Whoopi Goldberg was approached by the casting team for Mother Abagail, but couldn't take the role as she was working on Sister Act 2: Back in the Habit (1993). Goldberg would later play Abagail in a 2020 web miniseries version of The Stand. When Dee was offered the role of Abagail, she felt she "was" the character and "my whole life has been research for Mother Abagail." Rob Lowe had been originally considered for the role of Larry Underwood, but Lowe felt that playing the more unusual role of the deaf and mute Nick Andros would be a great challenge and was able to convince Garris that it would better suit the production (Lowe has been deaf in his right ear since childhood). Adam Storke ended up with the role of Underwood, where his musical skills were an asset.

Bates's character, Rae Flowers, was originally a man (Ray Flowers), but when Bates became available, King – who wanted her to play the part – rewrote the role as a woman. King played Teddy Weizak, the first character he played that was intelligent and not a typecast "country asshole." He has less of a presence in the miniseries, as King "had a lot of other fish on a lot of other griddles that I was trying to fry all at once." This also meant some of the lines Weizak originally meant to speak were transferred to Garris' character Henry Dunbarton.

Production

Budget
Despite the large scale of The Stand, ABC didn't cover all of its production costs and Laurel "lost its shirt" when it came to budgeting; the network expected Laurel to profit from worldwide distribution and home media sales, as it was owned by Blockbuster Video and the miniseries would get a worldwide distribution from one of the company's subsidiaries, Worldvision Enterprises. The total budget was $26 million, more than double that of all previous ABC King miniseries where it would be set at $12 million. With $3 million used for development, however, $23 million was used for production, leaving only $6 million for each two-hour episode.

Filming
The shooting of The Stand, which lasted for six months, took on a style of guerrilla filmmaking, where it was shot on a 16mm film camera; filming took place in at least two different locations each day, "places I hadn't seen until we began shooting there," Garris explained; and the effects artists had to do their job at a lower-than-usual price. Garris did everything he could to emphasize the miniseries' scale, such as filming wide shots of all the locations. Production designer Nelson Coates created all of the production's 225 sets. The dream version of Abagail's house involved a week of redressing the reality version of the home; the design was inspired by The Cabinet of Dr. Caligari, where "none of the lines were straight up and down" and "unreal colors" were used.

Filming began in Salt Lake City in February 1993 for what was originally the parts of the novel that took place in Boulder, Colorado. These scenes were initially planned to be shot in Boulder, but after the passage of Colorado Amendment 2, which nullified local gay rights laws, protests as well as the production team not morally agreeing with the Amendment led them not to shoot there. Shooting was moved to Utah, a state that had many Stephen King fans and religious people that related to the themes of the original novel, and four months of filming was done in Utah locations during what would be the state's bitterest winter in 100 years. The interior shots were done first with the plan that the snow will melt later on, only for that not to happen. This resulted in shots that featured weather not originally planned to be part of the plot, which worked in favor of some sequences in Garris's opinion.

For filming the gas station scene, they had to deal with freezing cold rain. There were supposed to be close-up shots of Stu Redman being still, but it was impossible for Sinise to not shake from the cold weather. Thus, the close-up shots were rejected. It was also tough for Sinise to deliver lines in filming days following the shoot. The harsh weather also caused another unforeseen problem. Faced with prices of $40 per stalk for New York-made fake cornstalks, Coates opted instead to grow 3,250 cornstalks as a cost-cutting measure; when a winter storm hit Utah, the reproduction of a Nebraska house with cornfield became complicated by the fact that the harsh weather did not allow the corn crop to grow taller than 4 feet.

The jail sequences were shot for three days at the sex offender wing of the Utah State Prison. However, the effects crew who were working on dead body dummies in the cells were unaware of this on the first day of shooting at the location and assumed it was an unused wing. The prison actually moved the sex offenders out of their cells for the miniseries, but the prisoners' belongings were left in the cells only for members of the effects team to confuse them as props by the art directors. On the first shooting day, the effects people moved all of the props from one cell to another; the next day, several letters were written by prisoners and attached to their respective cells, ranging from angry responses to bids for King to sign an autograph.

The miniseries was then shot in Las Vegas following the Utah shoots.

Effects

While many effects companies were interested in working on The Stand, Garris chose a colleague he knew for a very long time but never worked on a project with: Steve Johnson. Johnson had a been fan of King's books since twelve years before he started working on the miniseries, and the original novel was his favorite book by the author; he described it as "a dream come true" to work with King on set.

Johnson's team XFX did Abagail's age makeup, Flagg's demonic heads, the Trashcan Man's burn make-up, 60 dummies of the dead bodies, and facial hair controlled with electrostatics. The corpses of the flu victims were intended to be dummies rather than "movie monster[s]," Garris described. Bill Corso, a member of the effects team for The Stand, voices two of the corpses.

Randall Flagg
To work with Sheridan's clean-cut look in working on Randall Flagg's normal make-up, Johnson came up with the idea of adding a longer hair wig for a more abrasive look.

The source material's religious elements were referred to when designing Flagg's demon incarnations. According to writer Michael Beeler, Flagg's goat head was a "traditional concept of what evil in human form would be." In order for the ram horns to glow, they were made out of translucent substance with illumination coming from a backlight. For Flagg's hands, the effects team went for a recurring theme of eccentricities in how they worked, such as the extending of a third finger for symbolizing the devil's existence. In the scene where Flagg raises his fist at Abagail, the original screenplay presented him as having it clenched throughout; however, Johnson came up with a representation of Stigmata by first showing Flagg's palm with blood spewing out and then clenching it into a fist. The split-second shot of Flagg's fingers flexing backwards was done with the hand palm up, but the actor wore an appliance for a palm down illusion.

For the scarecrow form, Johnson was initially skeptical to create one due to the idea of it being "kind of silly" and attempted to persuade Garris not to include it. The two ultimately decided to produce a "rotted" version of the scarecrow, meaning the stitching of the fabric, as Beeler put it, "makes it appear as if it has scars all across its face that are coming apart at the seams with dust and sawdust falling out whenever it speaks." Johnson later admitted that the scarecrow was his favorite Flagg incarnation of the miniseries. For a silhouette shot of the scarecrow in the cornfield, the shape of the character's eyes and mouth are indicated through a glowing effect. The radiating contact lens used on the eyes were previously made by XFX for the film Innocent Blood (1992); while a light-emitting diode palate for the mouth was created by Rick Baker colleague Mark Setraikien and triggered via wires under Sheridan's make-up.

XFX members came up with multiple concepts for the scarecrow's hair, Johnson suggesting a set of mushrooms, flowers, and moss growing around it. He also thought of worms and cockroaches crawling in the hair for close-up shots; however, when they were placed on Sheridan's hair during a test, the actor freaked out and Johnson thought it "wouldn't have read on film anyway." The final result was that the hair was made of "muddy, twisted roots growing out of his head" which Johnson thought "looked the creepiest."

While Tom Barham of New York's Image Group company handled the morphing FX, Garris came up with the idea of having Flagg's head morph executed in a way different from the traditional media morph of one head design just melting into another: inside out. Not only was it different, but also a way to work around the limited budget as the morphing could look "active" without the camera having to move. In creating Flagg's morphs, the actor first filmed the scene on set without his makeup on. Then, on a greenscreen stage in Las Vegas, he was filmed doing the exact same action with makeup on, the camera set at precisely the same angle and character distance as the original shot. Both shots were then combined in post-production. The green-screening technique was done due to the amount of time it took to get Flagg's make-up on, which was at minimum three hours.

Trashcan Man
Six stages of burn make-up were placed on Frewer, such as when the Trashcan Man is burned by an oil factory explosion, a really hot desert sun, and radiation from an atomic bomb.

Facial hair
The growing facial hair effect seen on the extras was done by Camille Calvetty through a technique involving electrostatic charges; on each actor, she would first put adhesive all throughout the face, then trim the hair "to the right length" for it to be placed in a device that grows the hair through an electric charger. While this technique had been done on past films and television series, The Stand was the first ever production that involved it being applied to several extras. The varying amount of loose hair and make-up on each extra complicated the process according to Johnson: "You don't have a lot of control. So it takes an incredible amount of maintenance and a lot of patience to keep it looking good."

Releases

Original broadcast

Soundtrack

Credits and personnel

 Music composed by W. G. Snuffy Walden
 Executive producer: Robert Townson
 Produced by W. G. Snuffy Walden
 Music recorded and mixed by Ray Pyle and Avram Kipper at O'Henry Studios, Devonshire Studios and Taylor Made Studios
 Music editor: Allan K. Rosen
 Synclavier programming by Mark Morgan
 Orchestrations by Don Davis and John Dickson
 Scoring contractors: Paul Zimmitti and Debbi Datz
 Principal musicians:
 Guitar: W. G. Snuffy Walden and Dean Parks
 Piano: Randy Kerber
 Percussion: Michael Fisher
 Woodwinds: Jon Clarke
 Violin: Charlie Bisharat

Broadcast
ABC aired the highly anticipated miniseries in May 1994 for two reasons: it was a sweeps month, and it was the earliest month that didn't have new episodes of Monday Night Football and Roseanne in the line-up. All four parts were viewed by approximately 19 million homes, with Part 1 receiving a rating/share of 21.0/32, Part 2 receiving 21.0/32, Part 3 receiving 20.1/31, and Part 4 receiving 20.0/31.

Reception
On The New York Observer's 2014 list of the best Stephen King miniseries, The Stand ranked just behind the number-one pick, It (1990), the source praising the miniseries' performances.

The miniseries was met with generally positive reviews. John J. O'Connor at The New York Times wrote, "A great deal of time and money has gone into this production, and it's right up there on the screen...  The nagging problem at the heart of The Stand is that once the story settles early on into its schematic oppositions of good versus evil, sweet old Mother Abagail versus satanic Flagg, monotony begins to seep through the superstructure ... Muddled, certainly, but ... The Stand is clever enough to keep you wondering what could possibly happen next." Conversely, Emily L. Stephens of AV Club wrote, "The miniseries delivers monotony without either the corresponding sense of work or any monumental import. It shows very little of the labor and wrangling that goes into creating the comfortable enclave of the Boulder Free Zone. Paradoxically, by reaching for grandeur and pathos, Garris’ miniseries plunks itself firmly in bathos."

The series currently features a 70% "Certified Fresh" score on Rotten Tomatoes, based on an aggregate of 23 reviews.

Awards and nominations

Home media
The Stand was first released on DVD as a "Special Edition" in the United States on October 26, 1999, which contains only a Dolby Digital 2.0 audio of its original language and no subtitles. When The Stand was included on an unnamed September 25, 2007 DVD set that also featured The Langoliers (1995) and Golden Years (1991), Dolby Digital 2.0 Spanish and mono Portuguese dubs were added. The DVD including those features was issued separately on June 18, 2013. On June 12, 2018 it was part of another King adaptation collection that included The Langoliers, Golden Years, The Dead Zone (1983), Pet Sematary, Silver Bullet (1986), and Graveyard Shift (1990).

The Stand was later released on DVD in the United Kingdom on April 5, 2004, Denmark on October 9, 2007 and Finland on October 10, 2007. The UK versions features Dolby Digital 2.0 tracks in English, French, German, and Spanish; and subtitles in English, German, Portuguese, Spanish, Croatian, Czech, Danish, Hebrew, Icelandic, Norwegian, Polish, Slovenian, Swedish, and Turkish subtitles. The Danish and Finnish versions include the same audio tracks as the UK edition (plus an Italian dub) but there are significant differences when it comes to subtitle settings; the UK's Portuguese, Croatian, Slovenian, Czech, Turkish, and Hebrew subtitles are removed with the addition of Finnish, Dutch, French, and Italian subtitles.

The Stand was issued on Blu-ray in Spain on September 18, 2019; the United States and Canada on September 24, 2019; Germany on September 26, 2019; the United Kingdom on October 7, 2019; Finland, Norway, and Sweden on October 14, 2019; and Denmark on October 17, 2019.

See also
 The Stand (2020 miniseries)
 Pandemic
 State of nature

References

Works cited

External links
 

The Stand
1994 films
1994 horror films
1994 television films
1994 American television series debuts
1994 American television series endings
1990s American television miniseries
American horror television films
1994 science fiction films
American Broadcasting Company original programming
Biological weapons in popular culture
Demons in television
Demons in film
Films based on horror novels
Films about dreams
Films about nightmares
Films about influenza outbreaks
Films directed by Mick Garris
Television shows set in Arkansas
Television shows set in Colorado
Television shows set in the Las Vegas Valley
Television shows set in Maine
Television shows set in Nebraska
Television shows set in New York City
Television shows set in Texas
American post-apocalyptic films
Religious horror films
1990s road movies
American road movies
Films with screenplays by Stephen King
Television shows about dreams
Television shows about nightmares
Television shows based on works by Stephen King
Television series by CBS Studios
Television shows about influenza outbreaks
1990s American horror television series
Television shows written by Stephen King
Films about viral outbreaks
1990s American films